John Stoddart (or Stoddard, March 30, 1842 – August 5, 1926) was a member of the Wisconsin State Assembly.

Biography
Stoddart was born on March 30, 1842 in Kirkcaldy, Scotland. His places of residence included Fond du Lac County, Wisconsin and Dodge County, Wisconsin. He died at his home in Fox Lake, Wisconsin on August 5, 1926.

Career
Stoddart was elected to the Assembly in 1888. Other positions he held include Chairman (similar to Mayor) of Fox Lake. He was a Democrat.

References

People from Kirkcaldy
Scottish emigrants to the United States
People from Fond du Lac County, Wisconsin
People from Dodge County, Wisconsin
Democratic Party members of the Wisconsin State Assembly
Mayors of places in Wisconsin
1842 births
1926 deaths